The 1999 Bandy World Championship was a competition between bandy playing nations for men. The championship was played in Russia between 30 January-7 February 1999. Russia became champions.

Participant teams

Premier tour
 30 January
 Kazakhstan – USA 5–0
 Sweden – Norway 8–1
 Russia – Finland 5–3
 31 January
 USA – Sweden 0–11
 Norway – Finland 4–5
 Kazakhstan – Russia 2–11
 1 February
 Norway – Kazakhstan 6–2
 Finland – Sweden 3–4
 USA – Russia 1–12
 3 February
 Finland – USA 11–1
 Sweden – Kazakhstan 16–0
 Norway – Russia 1–6
 4 February
 Norway – USA 7–0
 Kazakhstan – Finland 2–6
 Russia – Sweden 0–0 3–2 (penalty shootout)

Final Tour

Match for 5th place
 6 February
 Kazakhstan – USA 5–2

Semifinals
 6 February
 Russia – Norway 4–1
 Finland – Sweden 6–2

Match for 3rd place
 7 February
 Sweden – Norway 9–1

Final
 7 February
 Russia – Finland 5–0

References

1999
1999 in bandy
1999 in Russian sport
World Championship,1999
January 1999 sports events in Russia
February 1999 sports events in Russia